Padre José Maria Nemesio Otaño y Eguino (Azcoitia, Guipúzcoa, 19 December 1880 - San Sebastián, Guipúzcoa, 29 April 1956) was a Spanish musicologist and composer.

See also
Basque music

References

1880 births
1956 deaths